Rinchen Barsbold (Rinchyengiin Barsbold, born December 21, 1935 in Ulaanbaatar) is a Mongolian paleontologist and geologist. He works with the Institute of Geology, at Ulaanbaatar, Mongolia. He is an expert in vertebrate paleontology and Mesozoic stratigraphy.

Barsbold has been instrumental in the discovery and recovery of one of the largest dinosaur collections in the world.  His work has helped to form a more modern understanding of the later stages of dinosaur evolution in Eurasia.

Barsbold has had considerable influence on dinosaur paleontology in the Communist world. His scientific work has made him a leading authority on theropods of the Gobi Desert, starting with his doctoral dissertation on these dinosaurs. As early as 1983, he noted that in different lineages of theropods, many features previously only known from birds had evolved in various combinations (Barsbold 1983). He postulated that as a result of this "ornithization", one or several lineages of theropods that happened to acquire the proper combination of such traits went on to evolve into actual birds.

Since the identification of a number of feathered dinosaurs beginning in the late 1990s, Barsbold's ideas have been more fully appreciated. When he initially published his conclusions - a list of generally rather obscure anatomical features - in 1983, there was little exchange between the Mongolian scientific community and that of Western countries. Moreover, his early papers were usually published in Russian, in which few Western scientists are fluent.  In addition, Evgeny Kurochkin - a leading specialist on bird paleontology in the Soviet sphere - was critical of the theropod-bird link, working with and teaching mostly Cenozoic bird paleontology. Therefore, Barsbold's theories initially had more impact among paleontologists in Mongolia, the USSR, and allied countries.

He is the son of scientist and writer Byambyn Rinchen.

Dinosaur identification
Barsboldia (Maryanska and Osmolska, 1981) is named after him.

The dinosaur genera and families named by Barsbold are, in alphabetical order:
 Adasaurus (1983)
 Anserimimus (1988)
 Conchoraptor (1986)
 the family Enigmosauridae (1983) (now synonymous with Therizinosauridae)
 Enigmosaurus (with A. Perle, 1983)
 Gallimimus (with H. Osmólska and E. Roniewicz, 1972)
 Garudimimus and the family Garudimimidae (1981)
 Harpymimus and the family Harpymimidae (with A. Perle, 1984)
 "Ingenia" (1981) (occupied, now Heyuannia yanshini)
 the subfamily Ingeniinae (1981) (now synonymous with Heyuaniinae)
 the family Oviraptoridae (1976)
 the suborder Segnosauria (with A. Perle, 1980) (now synonymous with Therizinosauria)

References
 Barsbold, Rinchen (1983): O ptich'ikh chertakh v stroyenii khishchnykh dinozavrov. ["Avian" features in the morphology of predatory dinosaurs]. Transactions of the Joint Soviet Mongolian Paleontological Expedition 24: 96-103. [Original article in Russian.] Translated by W. Robert Welsh, copy provided by Kenneth Carpenter and converted by Matthew Carrano. PDF fulltext

1935 births
Living people
Mongolian paleontologists
Mongolian geologists
Foreign Members of the Russian Academy of Sciences